was a Japanese photographer particularly known for his depiction of architecture, gardens, and Japanese crafts.

Career
Iwamiya was born on 4 January 1920 in Yonago, Tottori, the second son of parents running a shop selling traditional confectionery. An uncle of his ran a commercial photography studio, and this triggered the boy's interest in photography; but as a high school student he was keenest on baseball. After graduation from high school he worked Hankyu Department Store in Umeda (Osaka), where he entered the Mitsuwa photography club (Mitsuya shashin kurabu), led by Bizan Ueda and Nakaji Yasui. Following success in a photographic contest arranged by Asahi Shinbun, Iwamiya was invited to join the Tampei Photography Club and went on to become an assistant of Yasui's. He joined the Nankai Hawks in 1939 but left after half a year and in 1941 was sent to Manchukuo as a photographer.

Iwamiya returned to [mainland] Japan before the end of the war, and after the war opened a photofinishing shop serving a US base at Sannomiya (Kobe). While recuperating from tuberculosis in 1954, he photographed a mannequin factory nearby in Osaka; these photographs won the gold medal in the second Fuji Photo Contest, and were exhibited in the Matsushima Gallery (Matsushima gyararī) in Ginza (Tokyo), as Iwamiya's first solo show. He also exhibited in West Germany, and at around this time got to know Ken Domon, who exerted a great influence on him. In 1955 he set up Iwamiya Photos (Iwamiya fotosu) for commercial photography. Iwamiya's photographs of Sado island were exhibited at the Osaka Fuji Photo Salon and elsewhere in 1956; these would later appear in book form.

Two of Iwamiya's apprentices went on to be famous photographers in their own right. Seiryū Inoue joined Iwamiya's studio in 1951 and was encouraged by Iwamiya in his photographic work in Kamagasaki. Daidō Moriyama joined Iwamiya's studio in 1959 and was taken under Inoue's wing until Moriyama's departure for Tokyo in 1961.

From 1962, Iwamiya brought out a considerable number of books, mostly depicting Japanese crafts and architecture; several won awards. In 1966 he became a professor of Osaka University of Arts.

Iwamiya died in Osaka on 26 June 1989.

Exhibitions

Solo exhibitions
"Iwamiya Takeji-ten". Fuji Photo Salon (Osaka), Matsushima Gallery (Matsushima gyararī, Tokyo), 1955.
"Sado". Fuji Photo Salon (Osaka), Matsushima Gallery (Tokyo), 1956. (Photographs of Sado island)
"Hawai". Takashimaya (Osaka), Fuji Photo Salon (Tokyo), 1960. (Photographs of Hawai'i)
"Katachi". Takashimaya (Osaka), Fuji Photo Salon (Tokyo), 1963.
"Ankōru Watto". Ginza Nikon Salon (Tokyo), 1964. (Photographs of Angkor Wat)
"Kyūtei no niwa". Sogo (Kobe), 1968.
"Expo '70 Iwamiya Takeji shashin-ten". Hanshin (Osaka), 1970.
"Foto irasutorēshon arufoto". Imahashi Garō (Osaka), Art Gallery U (Tokyo), 1970.
[Title unknown]. Honolulu, 1970.
"Sumi to sue to watakushi to". Pentax Gallery (Tokyo), 1974.
"Butsuzō no imēji". Takashimaya (Kyoto), Sogo (Hiroshima) 1976.
"Mita, totta". Naniwa Photopia Gallery (Osaka), 1974.
"Mita, totta". Nikon Salon (Tokyo and Osaka), 1975. (Photographs of Spain and Portugal)
. Imai Gallery (Osaka), 1975.
"Hyōkai". Shinsaibashi Gallery (Osaka), 1975. (Oil paintings)
"Iwamiya Takeji shashin-ten". Fuji Photo Salon (Tokyo), 1976.
"Butsuzō no imēji". Takashimaya (Kyoto), Sogo (Hiroshima) 1976.
"Sumi to watakushi to". Shinsaibashi Gallery (Osaka), 1977.
"Kyō no katachi". Asahi Kaikan (Kyoto), 1976.
"Iwamiya Takeji shashin-ten". Asahi Kaikan (Kyoto and Tokushima), 1976.
"Serigurafī to Tapistorī". Shinsaibashi Gallery (Osaka), 1977.
"Shirukusukurīn ni yoru 'mado'". Shinsaibashi Gallery (Osaka and Tottori), 1977.
"Works from 30 years". Fuji Photo Salon (Tokyo and Osaka), Wakita Gallery (Nagoya), Tokushima Arts Foundation for Culture (Tokushima), Daimaru (Tottori), Imai Gallery (Yonago), 1977.
"Sumi to serigurafi". Iida Garō Bekkan (. Tokyo), 1977.
"Serigurafu-ten". Mingei Garō (Kurayoshi), Imai Gallery (Yonago), 1978.
"Nepāru no katachi". Fuji Photo Salon (Osaka), Shinjuku Minolta Photo Space (Tokyo), Kathmandu, 1979.
"Indo ni okeru butsuzō, shinzō, megamizō". Ban Garow (Osaka), 1980.
"Mucho Sol: Taiyō ga ippai". Canon Salon (Tokyo, Osaka, and Nagoya), 1980.
"Suiboku-ga to insatsu inku". Nakamura Garō (Osaka), 1981.
"Sobyō". Shinsaibashi Gallery (Osaka), 1981.
"Iwamiya Takeji-ten". Shinjuku Olympus Gallery (Tokyo), Naniwa Photopia Gallery (Osaka), 1981.
"Iwamiya Takeji no me: 35-nen no kiseki-ten". Minolta Photo Space (Osaka), 1981.
"Butsuzō no imēji" Nagase Photo Salon (Tokyo), 1981.
"Iwamiya Takeji-ten". Professional Space, 1982.
"Fotorama no tabi: Indo, Nepāru". Fuji Photo Salon (Osaka), 1982.
"Yōroppa no hikari to kage". Minolta Photo Space (Tokyo), 1982.
"Iwamiya Takeji-ten". Olympus Gallery (Tokyo), 1982.
"Kioku: Yōroppa kikō". Minolta Photo Space (Tokyo, Osaka and Fukuoka), 1982–83.
"Butsuzō no imēji" Osaka, 1982.
"Sho, __ sobyō". Shinjuku Olympus Gallery (Tokyo), 1982.
"Mitsu no mezotto ni yoru onna shirīzu". Chaya Garō (. Osaka), 1984.
"Ankōru". Ginza Wako Hall (Tokyo), Keihan Gallery of Arts and Science (Osaka), 1987.
"Abstraction". Kodak Photo Salon (Tokyo and Osaka), 1987.
"The Image of the Buddha". Bijutsu Gyararī Itami (Itami), 1987.
"Portrait". Pentax Forum (Tokyo and Osaka), 1989.
"Ima ni ikiru". Navio Art Museum (Hankyu, Osaka), 1989.
"Iwamiya Takeji-ten". Yonago City Museum of Art (Yonago), 1990.
"Yomigaeru Borobudūru". Nikon Salon (Tokyo and Osaka), 1990.
"Ima ni ikiru". Fuji Photo Salon (Tokyo and Osaka), 1990.
"Iwamiya Takeji-ten". Brain Center Gallery (Burēn sentā gyararī), 1996.
"Iwamiya Takeji sakuhin-ten: Sengo kara 1970 nendai made no sakka katsudō". JCII Photo Salon (Tokyo), 1996.
"Iwamiya Takeji: Kekkai no bi". Photo Art Gallery, Canon Sales Makuhari head office building (Kyanon hanbai Makuhari honsha biru Fotoāto gyararī, Chiba), 1996.
"Iwamiya Takeji no shashin sekai 1946–1975: Works from 30 years". Osaka Contemporary Art Center (Osaka), 2001.
"Iwamiya Takeji: Ima ni ikiru". Museum of Arts and Crafts, Itami (Itami), 2001.
"Iwamiya Takeji no shashin sekai / Ima ni ikiru". Osaka Contemporary Art Center (Osaka), 2001.
"Takeji Iwamiya: Photo and Drawing Exhibition". Osaka Contemporary Art Center (Osaka), January–February 2007.

Selection of other exhibitions
"Tōkyō dai-ikkai demokurāto bijutsuten". Matsushima Gallery (Matsushima gyararī, Tokyo), 1952.
Tanpei 8-nin shashinten". Tokyo, 1952. (Work by eight members of the Tampei Photography Club)
"Subjektive Fotografie 2". Saarbrücken, 1954–55.
"Iwamiya Takeji Horiuchi Hatsutarō-ten". Fuji Film Gallery (Tokyo), 1955. Work by Iwamiya and Hatsutarō Horiuchi)
"Rokunin-ten / Akiyama Shōtarō, Hayashi Tadahiko, Horiuchi Hatsutarō, Ueda Shōji, Midorikawa Yōichi, Iwamiya Takeji". Fuji Film Gallery (Tokyo), 1959. (Work by Shōtarō Akiyama, Tadahiko Hayashi, Hatsutarō Horiuchi, Shōji Ueda, and Yōichi Midorikawa)
"Sannin-ten / Akiyama Shōtarō, Nakamura Masaya, Iwamiya Takeji". Pentax Gallery (Tokyo), 1969 and annually thereafter. (Work by Shōtarō Akiyama, Masaya Nakamura, and Iwamiya)
"Ei-Q to Demokurāto-ten". Umeda Kindai Bijutsukan, 1974. (On Ei-Q and the "Democrat" group)
"Butsuzō no imēji-ten". Ginza Wako Hall (Tokyo), Amagasaki Cultural Center (Amagasaki), museum of Hongik University (Seoul), 1975.
"Sengo shashin / Saisei to tenkai" / Twelve Photographers in Japan, 1945–55. Yamaguchi Prefectural Museum of Art (Yamaguchi), 1990.
"Ueda Shōji to sono nakama-tachi: 1935–55". Yonago City Museum of Art (Yonago), 1992. (Exhibition of works by Shōji Ueda and his friends)
"Maeda Tōshirō, Itō Tsugurō, Iwamiya Takeji" (. Osaka Contemporary Art Center, March–April 2008. An exhibition of Tōshirō Maeda, Tsugurō Itō, and Iwamiya.

Works in permanent collections
Works by Iwamiya are in the permanent collections of the following institutions:
Canon Marketing Japan; 30 works acquired in the 1990s
Osaka University of Arts; 735 works acquired in the 1990s
Osaka Contemporary Art Center (Osaka)
Tokyo Metropolitan Museum of Photography; 30 works acquired in the 1990s
Yamaguchi Prefectural Museum of Art (Yamaguchi City); 12 works acquired in the 1990s
Yonago City Museum of Art; 735 works acquired in the 1990s

Books showing Iwamiya's works
Sadogashima / Sado Island. Kadokawa Shashin Bunko 34. Tokyo: Kadokawa Shoten, 1956. Black-and-white photographs of Sado island.  Captions and text in Japanese only (despite the color photographs and English title on the cover).
Nikkō. Nihon no yashiro. Tokyo: Bijutsu Shuppansha, 1962. Photographs of Nikkō. Text by Ichirō Hariu and Toshio Fukuyama. 
Katachi: Nihon no denshō. Tokyo: Bijutsu Shuppansha, 1962. Two volumes. Text by Shūji Takashina. 
1. Ki kami tsuchi
2. Ishi kane suji take
Sado. Tokyo: Asahi Shinbunsha, 1962. Photographs of Sado island. 
Katachi: Japanese Pattern and Design in Wood, Paper, and Clay. New York: Abrams, 1963. London, Weidenfeld & Nicolson, 1964. Text by Donald Richie. 
Design and Craftsmanship of Japan: Stone, Metal, Fibers and Fabrics, Bamboo. Tokyo: Bijutsu Shuppansha, 1963. New York: Abrams, 1965.
Le Japon des formes: Bois, papier, argile. Tokyo: Bijutsu Shuppansha; Fribourg: Office du Livre; Paris: Société Française du Livre, 1963. Text by Atsuko N. Nii and Donald Richie, translation by Edith Combe. 
Forme giapponesi. Milano, Silvana editoriale d'arte, 1963. Text by Atsuko N. Nii and Donald Richie. 
Tōshōgū. Tokyo: Bijutsu Shuppansha, 1963. Photographs of Tōshō-gū. Text by Isamu Kurita and Kiyofumi Yajima. 
Japon, beauté des formes: Pierre, métal, fibres, bambou. Tokyo, Bijutsu Shuppansha, 1964. 
Die Schönheit japanischer Formen: Stein, Metall, Textilien, Stroh, Bambus. Tokyo, Bijutsu Shuppansha, 1964. 
Itsukushima. Nihon no yashiro. Tokyo: Bijutsu Shuppansha, 1964. Photographs of Itsukushima. Text by Masatake Uwayokote and Toshio Fukuyama. 
Nihon no shi Tokyo: Bijutsu Shuppansha, 1965.
Nihon no yashiro. Tokyo: Bijutsu Shuppansha, 1965. 
Impressions of Japan. Tokyo: Bijutsu Shuppansha, 1965. 
Kyō / Kyoto in Kyoto. Kyoto: Tankō Shinsha, 1965. Photographs of Kyoto. Text by Jirō Osaragi. 
Ishi no tera. Kyoto: Tankō Shinsha, 1965. Text by Isamu Kurita. 
Yamato no sekibutsu. Kyoto: Tankō Shinsha, 1965. Text by Tatsuko Hoshino. 
Kekkai no bi: Koto no dezain. Kyoto: Tankō Shinsha, 1966. Text by Teiji Itō. 
Ryūkyū. Nihon no kōgei. Tokyo: Tankōsha, 1966. Photographs of the Ryūkyū islands. Text by Seikō Hokama. 
Kamera kikō: Ryūkyū no shinwa. Tokyo: Tankōsha, 1966. Photographs of the Ryūkyū islands. Text by Torigoe Kenzaburō. 
Tōka no bi: Koto no dezain. Kyoto: Tankō Shinsha, 1967. Photographs of lanterns. Text by Teiji Itō. 
The World of the Japanese Garden: From Chinese Origins to Modern Landscape Art. New York: Weatherhill, 1968.
Kyōto no niwa: Karā. Kyoto: Tankō Shinsha, 1968. Photographs of the gardens of Kyoto. Text by Michio Takeyama. 
Kyūtei no niwa. Kyoto: Tankō Shinsha, 1968. Photographs of Japanese palace gardens. 
1. Sentō Gosho. Photographs of Sentō Imperial Palace. Text by Yukio Mishima and Teiji Itō.
2. Katsura Rikyū. Photographs of Katsura Detached Palace. Text by Yasushi Inoue and Teiji Itō.
3. Shugakuin Rikyū. Photographs of Shugakuin Detached Palace. Text by Jirō Osaragi and Teiji Itō.
Arte del objeto japonés / Art of the Japanese Object / Art de l'objet japonais / Kunst des japanischen Gegenstands. Text by Maria Lluïsa Borràs. Barcelona: Ediciones Polígrafa, 1969.  
Nihon Bankokuhaku no kenchiku / The Edifice in Expo 70. Tokyo: Asahi Shinbunsha, 1970. Photography by Iwamiya, Yasuhiro Ishimoto, and Shōzō Kitadai of the buildings of Expo 70 (Osaka).  
Imperial Gardens of Japan: Sento Gosho, Katsura, Shugaku-in. New York: Weatherhill, 1970. . 1978. , . Text by Teiji Itoh, Yukio Mishima, Yasushi Inoue, Jirō Osaragi, and Loraine Kuck. 
Shinpen Kyūtei no niwa 2. Kyoto: Tankōsha, 1971. 
Kyōto. Tokyo: Mainichi Shinbunsha, 1971.
The Japanese Garden: An Approach to Nature. New Haven: Yale University Press, 1972. . Text by Teiji Ito, translation by Donald Richie. 
Kyōto no miryoku. Karā: Rakuchū. Kyoto: Tankōsha, 1972. Photographs of Kyoto. Text by Naokatsu Nakamura. 
Nihon no niwa. Tokyo: Chūōkōronsha, 1972. Text by Itō Teiji and Yūsaku Kamekura. 
Nihonkai. Kyoto: Tankōsha, 1972. Photographs of the Japan Sea. Text by Tsutomu Minakami. 
Nihon no kokoro: Hyakunin isshu. Special Winter 1972 issue of Taiyō. Tokyo: Heibonsha, 1973. Much of the photography, of hyakunin isshu, is by Iwamiya. 
The Graphic Design of Yusaku Kamekura. New York: Weatherhill, 1973. Text by Herbert Bayer, Masaru Katsumi, and Yusaku Kamekura. 
Ōsaka. Osaka: Toppan Sēruzu, 1973. Photographs of Osaka. Text by Takeshi Ōtaka. 
Tōrō. Tokyo: Shūeisha, 1973. Photographs of garden lanterns. Text by Masatarō Kawakatsu. 
Shiragi no sekibutsu. Tokyo: Asahi Shinbunsha, 1974.
Nihon no teien. Tokyo: Shūeisha, 1974. Photographs of Japanese gardens. Text by Osamu Mori. 
Nihon no senshoku. Tokyo: Mainichi Shinbunsha, 1975. Photographs of Japanese dyed and woven materials. Text by Tomoyuki Yamanobe. 
Butsuzō no imēji: Shashinten. Osaka: Osaka University of Arts, 1975. Catalogue of an exhibition of photographs of Buddhist statuary. 
Iwamiya Takeji shashinshū / Takeji Iwamiya Works from 30 Years. Tokyo: Nihon Shashin Kikaku, 1976. A retrospective of Iwamiya's work. 
Kyō no niwa. Tokyo: Kokusai Jōhōsha, 1976. Photographs of the gardens of Kyoto. Text by Kantō Shigemori. 
Sado / Sado. Sonorama Shashin Sensho 2. Tokyo: Asahi Sonorama, 1977. Black-and-white photographs of Sado island.  With a short text in English, but the captions are in Japanese only.
Karā Kyūtei no niwa. Kyoto: Tankōsha, 1977. Color photographs of the gardens of Japanese palaces. 
Sentō Gosho. Photographs of Sentō Imperial Palace. Text by Yukio Mishima and Teiji Itō. 
Katsura Rikyū. Photographs of Katsura Detached Palace. Text by Yasushi Inoue and Teiji Itō. 
Shugakuin Rikyū. Photographs of Shugakuin Detached Palace. Text by Jirō Osaragi and Teiji Itō.
The Japanese Garden. 2nd ed. Tokyo: Zokeisha, 1978. . Text by Itō Teiji.  Translation of Nihon no niwa.
Kyō: Iro to katachi. Nihon no Bi. Tokyo: Shūeisha, 1978. 
Nihon no katachi. Kyoto: Tankōsha, 1978. Text by Mitsukuni Yoshida and Yoshio Hayakawa 
Kyōto: Iwamiya Takeji jisenshū. Osaka: Toki Shobō, 1979. Photographs of Kyoto. 
Forms, Textures, Images: Traditional Japanese Craftmanship in Everyday Life. New York: Weatherhill, 1979. . Text by Mitsukuni Yoshida and Richard L. Gage. 
Mokuzen shingo. Osaka: Iwamiya Takeji Shashin Jimusho, 1980.  A collection of writings by Iwamiya.
Ankōru: Iwamiya Takeji shashinshū. Tokyo: Iwanami Shoten, 1984. . Photographs of Angkor Wat. Text by Yoshiaki Ishizawa ). 
Utsukushii Hyōgo / The Beautiful Hyogo. Hyōgo: Hyōgo Prefecture, 1986.  Iwamiya is editor and contributing photographer.
Radakku mandara: Iwamiya Takeji shashinshū. Tokyo: Iwanami Shoten, 1987. . Color photographs of Ladakh and its mandalas. 
Iwamiya Takeji-ten: Ima ni ikiru. Tokyo: PPS Tsūshinsha, 1989. . Exhibition catalogue. 
Ajia no butsuzō: Iwamiya Takeji shashinshū. Tokyo: Shūeisha, 1989. 2 vols. . Photographs of Asian Buddhist statuary. Text by Takashi Koezuka. 
Sengo shashin / Saisei to tenkai / Twelve Photographers in Japan, 1945–55. Yamaguchi: Yamaguchi Prefectural Museum of Art, 1990.   Despite the alternative title in English, almost exclusively in Japanese. Photographs by Iwamiya, pp. 115–21; text pp. 205–208.
Japanese Gardens: Images, Concepts, Symbolism. Tokyo: Hitachi, 1990.
Borobudūru: Iwamiya Takeji shashinshū. Tokyo: Iwanami Shoten, 1990. . Black-and-white photographs of Borobudur. 
Les cimes de l'éveil: Monastères bouddhiques du Ladakh. Paris: Hologramme, 1990. Text by Gilles Béguin. 
Ueda Shōji to sono nakama-tachi: 1935–55 (Shōji Ueda and his friends, 1935–55). Yonago, Tottori: Yonago City Museum of Art, 1992. Catalogue of an exhibition held in February–March 1992, with works by Iwamiya on pp. 131–42. 
Iwamiya Takeji sakuhin-ten: Sengo kara 1970 nendai made no sakka katsudō. JCII Photo Salon Library 55. Tokyo: JCII Photo Salon, 1995. Catalogue of an exhibition of Iwamiya's works from the end of the war till the 1970s.. 
Katachi: Classic Japanese Design. San Francisco: Chronicle, 1999. . Text by Kazuya Takaoka. 
Nihon no katachi / Katachi: Japanese Sacred Geometry. Tokyo: Pie, 1999. . Text by Kazuya Takaoka. 2005. .  
Kyōdo-sakka Iwamiya Takeji-ten zuroku: Shashin de toraeta bi to fūdo. Amagasaki, Hyōgo: Amagasaki Cultural Center, 2001. Exhibition catalogue. 
Ajia e no shiten: Anri Karutie-buresson / Iwamiya Takeji. Osaka: Osaka University of Arts Museum, 2002. Exhibition of photographs of Asia by Henri Cartier-Bresson and Iwamiya.

References

External links
Site about Iwamiya, 1997. 
Site about Iwamiya hosted by Osaka Contemporary Art Center. 
Iwamiya at Fujifilm Museum. 

Japanese photographers
Academic staff of Osaka University of Arts
Photography academics
1920 births
1989 deaths
Artists from Tottori Prefecture
Photography in India
People from Yonago, Tottori